Leisure Village West is an unincorporated community and census-designated place (CDP) located within Manchester Township, in Ocean County, New Jersey, United States. Until the 2000 Census, the CDP had been part of the Leisure Village West-Pine Lake Park CDP, which was split for the 2010 enumeration into separate CDPs for Leisure Village West and Pine Lake Park. As of the 2010 United States Census, the CDP's population was 3,493. Leisure Village West is one of several active adult communities bearing similar names. Leisure Village and Leisure Village East are the other two communities nearby.

Geography
According to the United States Census Bureau, the CDP had a total area of 1.222 square miles (3.164 km2), including 1.210 square miles (3.133 km2) of land and 0.012 square miles (0.031 km2) of water (0.98%).

Demographics

Census 2010

References

Census-designated places in Ocean County, New Jersey
Manchester Township, New Jersey
Populated places in the Pine Barrens (New Jersey)